Sterling College is a private work college in Craftsbury, Vermont. Its curriculum is focused on ecological thinking and action through a major in Environmental Studies with concentrations in Ecology, Environmental Humanities, Outdoor Education, and Sustainable Agriculture & Food Systems. The college is accredited by the New England Commission of Higher Education.

History
Sterling School was founded as a boys' college preparatory school in 1958. The school's educational philosophy was later influenced by that of Outward Bound founder Kurt Hahn. The school's transition to higher education in the 1970s began with the Academic Short Course in Outdoor Leadership, a 21-day program. In 1974, Sterling School was faced with closure and a small group of faculty launched the educational model that became Sterling College.

In 1974, a small group of faculty established an academic year-long program similar to Outward Bound programs known as Grassroots Project in Vermont at Sterling Institute. By 1983, Sterling had developed into an accredited college offering an Associate of Arts degree in resource management with full accreditation by the New England Association of Schools and Colleges granted in 1987.

Since 1997, Sterling College has been accredited as a four-year college. It awards Bachelor of Arts degrees in Ecology, Environmental Humanities, Outdoor Education, and Sustainable Agriculture & Food Systems. Sterling College joined the Work Colleges Consortium in 1999.

In 2013, Sterling College announced that it would be the first college in Vermont, and the third college in the nation, to divest its endowment from fossil fuel extractors.

Academics

Sterling College offers associate and bachelor's degrees. It was the first college in the nation to offer a minor in Draft Horse Management.

In 2013, Sterling College created the Rian Fried Center for Sustainable Agriculture and Food Systems. Named for the late trustee, it will be the center point for the college's focus on sustainable agriculture and sustainable food systems.

Sterling College also launched a continuing education program in 2013, with a series of 2- and 4-week short courses. The first course offered was a two-week cheese-making intensive in partnership with the Cellars at Jasper Hill. Other courses feature guest faculty such as Sandor Katz, John Elder, Rowan Jacobsen, Ginger Strand, and Clare Walker Leslie.

Campus
It has 14 buildings, including a woodworking shop and a library. Outdoor teaching facilities include a managed woodlot, a challenge course, a  climbing tower, managed gardens, and a working livestock farm with two solar-powered barns. Much of what is grown and raised on campus is consumed in the dining hall. Sterling produces approximately 35% of its own food, with an overall 53% coming from within a 150-mile radius of the college.

References

External links
Official website

Craftsbury, Vermont
Private universities and colleges in Vermont
Educational institutions established in 1958
Buildings and structures in Craftsbury, Vermont
Education in Orleans County, Vermont
Tourist attractions in Orleans County, Vermont
1958 establishments in Vermont
Work colleges
 Agricultural education
Sustainable agriculture
Agroecology
Sustainability